The mixed tandem event at the 2016 World Singles Ninepin Bowling Classic Championships was held in Cluj-Napoca, Romania on 22–23 May 2016.
The first round took place after ending of the sprint events. Rest part was played the next day.

The new world champions in mixed tandems became the Romanians Luminita Viorica Dogaru and Nicolae Lupu. The silver medals went to Hungarians Anita Sáfrány and László Karsai, while the bronzes were won by Austrians Lisa Vsetecka and Philipp Vsetecka, and Germans Simone Schneider and Fabian Seitz.

Results

Starting places 

The starting places have been allocated on the basis of each team's achievements during the previous championships.

Draw 

The tandems were drawn into bouts with the reservation that pair from the same country can not play in the first round against each other.

References

2016
Mixed tandem